Alçabulaq (formerly Sokhuldzhan) is a village and municipality in the Yardymli Rayon of Azerbaijan.  It has a population of 820.

Famous persons 
Ruzbeh Mammad, is Azerbaijani writer, journalist.

References 

Populated places in Yardimli District